Hermann-Josef Johann Tebroke (born 19 January 1964) is a German politician of the Christian Democratic Union (CDU) who has been serving as a member of the Bundestag from the state of North Rhine-Westphalia since 2017.

Political career 
Tebroke became a member of the Bundestag in the 2017 German federal election. In parliament, he is a member of the Finance Committee.

Other activities 
 RheinEnergie AG, Member of the Advisory Board
 RWE, Member of the Advisory Board

References

External links 

 Bundestag biography 

1964 births
Living people
Members of the Bundestag for North Rhine-Westphalia
Members of the Bundestag 2021–2025
Members of the Bundestag 2017–2021
Members of the Bundestag for the Christian Democratic Union of Germany